There are two municipalities named Sainte-Perpétue in Quebec:
Sainte-Perpétue, Centre-du-Québec, Quebec, in Nicolet-Yamaska Regional County Municipality
Sainte-Perpétue, Chaudière-Appalaches, Quebec, in L'Islet Regional County Municipality